The molecular formula C10H15N5O10P2 may refer to:

 Adenosine diphosphate
 Adenosine 3',5'-bisphosphate
 Deoxyguanosine diphosphate